The Khava is a river in the Voronezh Oblast in Russia. It is a left tributary of the river Usman.

Villages 
 Verkhnyaya Khava
 Talovaya
 Sukhie Gai
 Pravaya Khava
 Rozhdestvenskaya Khava
 Uspenskaya Khava
 Volna-Shepelinovka
 Parusnoe

References

Rivers of Voronezh Oblast